The State Archives of the Republic of North Macedonia, formerly known as the State Archives of the Republic of Macedonia (DARM) are the national archives of North Macedonia. It is located in Skopje in North Macedonia.

History
Prior to its founding in 1946, the archives were held in the National Archives of Serbia from 1926 until 1941. On May 3, 1945, it was decided by the People's Liberation Army of Macedonia that the archival collection should be held by the National and University Library "St. Kliment of Ohrid". Despite efforts, the collection was never moved to the library and on May 31 1946 the archive was founded.  The collected materials that were kept from this archive today are in the depots of the Archive of Macedonia.

With the adoption of the general law on state archives in Yugoslavia in 1950 on January 6, 1951, the National Assembly of the People's Republic of Macedonia adopted the Law on State Archives, which laid the foundation for the creation of the Archives of Macedonia (then State Archives of the People's Republic of Macedonia).

With this first normative act in the field of archival legislation in the Republic of Macedonia, not only laid the foundation for the creation of the Archive of Macedonia and its tasks, but it also determines the creation of several regional archives whose purpose was more intensively to collect, store, protect and process the archival material that was created in the institutions of the new state, but also in order to more thoroughly deal with the collection and protection of archival material that will serve to study the history of the Macedonian people. In the period from 1953 to 1960, nine regional historical archives were established and started operating, which in 1990 with the new Law on Archival Material became part of the Archives of Macedonia as regional units, in the cities: Bitola, Kumanovo, Ohrid, Prilep, Skopje, Strumica, Tetovo, Veles and Stip.

Immediately after its creation, the State Archive of the Republic of Macedonia started creating a network of archival institutions throughout the territory of the Republic of Macedonia. Initially, these were archival centers at the National Museums , and later they grew into independent institutions. Since 1990, the archive service in Macedonia has been integrated, making the independent archival institutions throughout the Republic regional offices.

The new purpose-built building has been in use since 1969.

Bilateral cooperation, research and publication are organized only in the central part of the Archive. The State Archive of the Republic of Macedonia has a Laboratory for Conservation and Restoration and a Laboratory for Microfilming .

The central part of the State Archive of the Republic of Macedonia has jurisdiction over the creators and holders of the archival material of national rank.

References

External links 
 State archives of the Republic of North Macedonia

North Macedonia
North Macedonia articles missing geocoordinate data
Buildings and structures in Skopje
Government agencies established in 1946